IndexMaster.com was a legal research database that allowed users find legal treatises and monographs. The search results allowed the researcher to view the tables of contents and indexes online.

History
Owned by IndexMaster Inc., IndexMaster.com was launched in 1998, it received the Best New Product of the Year in 2000 from the American Association of Law Libraries.

References 

Online law databases
American legal websites
Defunct websites
1998 establishments in the United States
Internet properties established in 1998
Defunct American websites